Seokchon Lake Park in Songpa District, Seoul, South Korea includes Seokchon Lake and Lotte World's Magic Island.

History
Seokchon Lake was originally a part of the Han River. There was an island named Burido in the middle of the Han River dividing it into two, Songpa River (the north part) and Sincheon River(the south part). In April 1971, a construction to connect Burido with land has started. It was proceeded by enlarging the Songpa River and closing the Sincheon River. By this construction, the closed southern part of the Han River became Seokchon Lake, and the land made by the reclamation project became Jamsil-dong and Sincheon-dong.

In the 1970s, Seokchon Lake used to be a tacky lake right after the construction. So people created a walking trail and planted trees, transforming the area into a park. After some time, Seokchon Lake started to suffer from water pollution, causing foul smells. This caused people to avoid Seokchon Lake Park. In 2001, Songpagu designated it to make into a tourist attraction and did some maintenance business. This caused the water to become clear and the ecological system to be recovered.

East Lake
The East Lake has a trail which is connected to West Lake under the Jamsilhosugyo (Jamsil Lake Bridge). Beside the trail, there are some facilities including some rest area and public restrooms. At the north side, there is a two-floor building which has the Songpa Travel Information Center on the second floor. In October 2014, the Rubber Duck was held on the East Lake by Lotte Group to celebrate the opening of the new Lotte World Mall. Also, the Super Moon Project was held in September 2016, an art project planned by the art collaborative group FriendsWithYou. The Super Moon is a 60-foot inflatable sculpture surrounded by a garden of eight symbolic planets of color and light.

West Lake
The West Lake is 112,065 m2 large and is slightly larger than the East Lake. Around the West Lake, there are Seoul Playground and Lotte World's Magic Island.

Seoul play ground
Seoul play ground (Hangul: 서울놀이마당; RR: Seoul Lorimadang) is an outdoor stage located inside Seokchon Lake Park where different kinds of folk arts are performed. It was built in 1984 for the presentation and preservation of Korean traditional folk art. The whole facility is 8,250 m2 large, and seats are 825 m2 large having seating capacity of 1,500. The building is a traditional style tile-roofed house, which has hip-and-gable roof and entasis columns.

Annually from April to October, Intangible Cultural Property and fusion folk art performance are held every weekend. Also, special performances are perform in traditional holidays of Korea (Seollal, Daeboreum, Chuseok). Songpa Sandae Noli, sheaf burning are some of the major performances held in the place.

Festivals
Seokchon Lake has many various festivals, including the Cherry Blossom Festival, Deciduous Street Festival, and the Seokchon Lake Concert. These festivals show many attractive parts of the Seokchon Lake.

Cherry Blossom Festival
The Seokchon Lake Cherry Blossom Festival is one of the most representative spring festivals in Seoul. The festival has many events such as shows performed by popular singers and amateur performance team. During the festival season, the Lotte World Tower at Seokchon Lake and the Magic Island combine with cherry blossoms, making a beautiful landscape. The 2021 Seokchon Lake Cherry Blossom Festival was held online due to Corona 19.

Deciduous Street Festival
In fall, Seokchon Lake Deciduous Street Festival begin, and Seokchon Lake is filled with thousands of deciduous leaves such as platanus, King cherry trees, ginkgo trees and maple trees. On the lake, you can see colorful Lanterns, and there is a night scenery view photo zone.

Seokchon Lake Music Concert
The Seokchon Lake Music Concert is held at East Side Central Waterfront Stage every Friday, Saturday and Sunday from mid-April to November. There are performances of various genres such as singing, dancing, pop, musical instrument.

Seokchon Lake Café Street
The cafe street is located next to the East Lake, about 1.1 km. There are about 12 cafes in the café street. There is one at approximately every 100 meters. There are various cafes in the vicinity of Seokchon Lake, which have unique names and different atmospheres. There are coffee shops, bakeries, and places you can eat fusion dishes. Also, since outdoor business is allowed in this area, one can eat outside looking at the scenery of the Seokchon Lake.

Controversy
From 2010 to 2013, the average water level of Seokchon lake was lowered from 4.63 meters to 4.17 meters. About 4 million tons of water was leaked from Seokchon Lake. Also, several large underground voids and sinkholes were observed near the lake and caused controversy about safety problems. According to an investigation by the City of Seoul, it was caused by massive underground operation from the construction of Lotte World Tower and Seoul Subway Line 9. In 2013, the City of Seoul started supplying water to maintain the lake's water level. As of 2015, the lake had an average water level of 4.8 meters.

References 

Parks in Seoul
Geography of Songpa District
Bodies of water of Seoul